Hollow Be My Name is the second album by the Australian post-hardcore band Eleventh He Reaches London. It was released by Good Cop Bad Cop in March, 2009.

Thematically, the album is dark and introspective.

Track listing
All music written by Eleventh He Reaches London, lyrics by Ian Lenton.

Vinyl Bonus Track

Personnel
Ian Lenton - vocals, electric guitar, banjo, percussion
Jayden Worts - electric guitar, acoustic guitar, vocals, synthesizer, percussion
Jeremy Martin - electric guitar, acoustic guitar, vocals, keys
Craig McElhinney - bass guitar
Mark Donaldson - drums
Seldon Hunt - artwork
Al Smith - mixing, mastering
Mike Wilson - photograph

References

2009 albums
Eleventh He Reaches London albums